The 1965–66 Algerian Cup is the 4th edition of the Algerian Cup. MC Saïda are the defending champions, having beaten ES Mostaganem 2–1 in the previous season's final.

Round of 64

Round of 32

Round of 16

Quarter-finals

Semi-finals

Final

Match

References

Algerian Cup
Algerian Cup
Algerian Cup